Denzil Meyrick (born 28 November 1965) is a Scottish bestselling novelist. Prior to that, he served as a police officer with Strathclyde Police then a manager with Springbank Distillery in Campbeltown, Argyll. Since 2012 Denzil Meyrick has worked as a writer of Scottish crime fiction novels. He is also an executive director of media production company Houses of Steel.

Career
Denzil Meyrick was educated at Campbeltown Grammar School, Argyll and then completed tertiary education at the University of Paisley. He is an author and his main series of novels are nine books of the Detective Chief Inspector (DCI) Jim Daley crime thriller series, set in the fictitious town of 'Kinloch', which is modelled on Campbeltown. Denzil Meyrick draws from experience during his twenties when he saw service as a police officer with Strathclyde Police. After his time there he followed a varied career, including the management of a distillery in Campbeltown.  He had many diverse roles, ranging from the director of a large engineering company to freelance journalism in both print and on radio.

In 2012, his first crime fiction novel, Whisky From Small Glasses was published. It was the first of his DCI Daley series. This novel was reprinted in 2014 by Polygon, a division of Birlinn. Following publication of that first story, Meyrick signed with Birlinn, where his next crime novels were published under the Polygon imprint. He is also published by HarperCollins Germany, and Aria in the United States.

Novels 
  Whisky From Small Glasses (2012)
 The Last Witness (2014)
 Dark Suits & Sad Songs (2015)
 The Rat Stone Serenade (2016)
 Well of the Winds (2017)
  The Relentless Tide (2018)
 A Breath on Dying Embers (2019)
 Jeremiah’s Bell (2020) 
 For Any Other Truth (2021)

Anthology and short stories 
 Dalintober Moon (2014)
 Two One Three (2015)
 Empty Nets and Promises (2016)
 Single End (2016)
 One Last Dram Before Midnight (2017) (anthology of DCI Daley short stories)

References

External links 
 Oban Times
Dundee University Review of The Arts
What's On In Glasgow Review
Amazon - 213
Amazon - The Ratstone Serenade
GoogleBooks - A Breath on Dying Embers

20th-century Scottish novelists
Scottish male novelists
1965 births
Living people
20th-century Scottish male writers
Scottish police officers
Alumni of the University of the West of Scotland
Officers in Scottish police forces